Dendrophthoe is a genus of hemiparasitic shrubs found in Asia and Australia known as mistletoes. The genus was described by German naturalist Carl Friedrich Philipp von Martius in 1830. Species in this genus have a variety of reported uses in the medical traditions of the region, most notably in Nepal.

Species
Plants of the World Online lists the following:
 Dendrophthoe acacioides (Benth.) Tiegh.
 Dendrophthoe carinata Danser
 Dendrophthoe clementis (Merr.) Danser
 Dendrophthoe constricta (Korth.) Danser
 Dendrophthoe copelandii (Merr.) Danser
 Dendrophthoe costulata Miq.
 Dendrophthoe curvata (Blume) Miq.
 Dendrophthoe falcata (L.f.) Ettingsh.
 Dendrophthoe flosculosa Danser
 Dendrophthoe fulva (Korth.) Miq.
 Dendrophthoe fuscata (Korth.) Miq.
 Dendrophthoe gangliiformis Barlow
 Dendrophthoe gjellerupii (Lauterb.) Danser
 Dendrophthoe glabrescens (Blakeley) Barlow
 Dendrophthoe haenkeana (C.Presl ex C.Schweinf.) Mart.
 Dendrophthoe hallieri (Merr.) Danser
 Dendrophthoe homoplastica (Blakeley) Danser
 Dendrophthoe incarnata (Jack) Miq.
 Dendrophthoe kerrii (Craib) Barlow
 Dendrophthoe lanosa (Korth.) Danser
 Dendrophthoe ligulatus (Thwaites) Tiegh.
 Dendrophthoe locellata Danser
 Dendrophthoe loheri (Merr.) Danser
 Dendrophthoe lonchiphylla (Thwaites) Danser
 Dendrophthoe longituba (Elmer) Danser
 Dendrophthoe luzonensis (C.Presl ex Schult.f.) G.Don
 Dendrophthoe malifolia (C.Presl ex Schult.f.) Miq.
 Dendrophthoe mearnsii (Merr.) Danser
 Dendrophthoe memecylifolia (Wight & Arn.) Danser
 Dendrophthoe mirifica Danser
 Dendrophthoe neelgherrensis (Wight & Arn.) Tiegh.
 Dendrophthoe odontocalyx (F.Muell. ex Benth.) Tiegh.
 Dendrophthoe pauciflora Danser
 Dendrophthoe pelagica Barlow
 Dendrophthoe pentandra (L.) Miq.
 Dendrophthoe pentapetala (Roxb.) G.Don
 Dendrophthoe praelonga (Blume) Miq.
 Dendrophthoe quadrifida Danser
 Dendrophthoe × rimituba Barlow
 Dendrophthoe sarcophylla (Wall. ex Wight & Arn.) Danser
 Dendrophthoe suborbicularis (Thwaites) Danser
 Dendrophthoe timorana (Danser) Barlow
 Dendrophthoe trichanthera Barlow
 Dendrophthoe villosa Danser
 Dendrophthoe vitellina (F.Muell.) Tiegh. (synonym Loranthus vitellinus)

Gallery

References

 
Loranthaceae genera